The Caucasian badger (Meles canescens) or Southwest Asian badger is a species of badger native to Western Asia and some islands in the Mediterranean Sea.

Taxonomy 
The Caucasian badger was formerly thought to be a subspecies of the European badger (M. meles), along with the other subspecies also classified within it. However, a 2013 study found significant genetic divergence between both species. It is thought that both diverged during the Pleistocene, between 2.37 million years ago to 450,000 years ago. The American Society of Mammalogists recognise it as a distinct species.

Description 
This species is smaller than the European badger, with a dirty-greyish back and brown highlights; its head is identical to the European badger, though with weaker crests; its upper molars are elongated in a similar way as the Asian badger's. Its fur can be distinguished from the Asian and Japanese badgers by its facial mask, which resembles that of the European badger.

Distribution 
The Caucasian badger ranges from Anatolia north to the Caucasus Mountains, south to the Levant and west-central Iran, and west through the Tian Shan mountains. It also occurs on the Mediterranean islands of Crete and Rhodes. The boundary of its range to the European badger is thought to be in the North Caucasus, but a clear boundary has not been defined, as both are known to be sympatric in some places, and potential hybrids have been identified. It was also recorded in Afghanistan.

Taxonomy 
Of the eight European badger subspecies recognized in 2005, four are now thought to belong to the Caucasian badger.

References 

Badgers
Mammals of Asia
Mammals of Turkey
Mammals of Western Asia
Mammals of Central Asia
Mammals of the Middle East
Fauna of Crete
Rhodes
Mammals of Europe